Jaitapur Nuclear Power Project is a proposed nuclear power plant in India.
If built, it would be the largest nuclear power generating station in the world by net generation capacity, at 9,900 MW.
The power project is proposed by Nuclear Power Corporation of India (NPCIL) and would be built at Madban village of Ratnagiri district in Maharashtra.

On 6 December 2010 agreement was signed for the construction of a first set of two third-generation European Pressurized Reactors and the supply of nuclear fuel for 25 years in the presence of French president Nicolas Sarkozy and Indian prime minister Manmohan Singh.
French state-controlled nuclear engineering firm Areva S.A. and Indian state-owned nuclear operator Nuclear Power Corporation of India signed the agreement, valued about $9.3 billion. This is a general framework agreement that was signed along with the agreement on 'Protection of Confidentiality of Technical Data and Information Relating to Nuclear Power Corporation in the Peaceful Uses of Nuclear Energy'.
The plant construction was expected to start in late 2018. As of June 2019, NPCIL officials could not give a time-frame as to when the Jaitapur plant would be operational.

In April 2021, EDF submitted a binding technico-commercial offer to NPCIL and hoped to reach a binding framework agreement "in the coming months".

Geography
The proposed Jaitapur Nuclear Power Project is located at the west coast of India. Jaitapur is on the Arabian Sea coast in Ratnagiri district in the southwestern part of Maharashtra, India. The district is a part of Konkan in Western Ghats. The Sahyadri Mountain range forms the eastern boundary of the Konkan, and the Arabian Sea marks the western boundary. Jaitapur was one of the important ports in ancient and early medieval times.

Project description 

It is proposed to construct 6 European Pressurized Reactors designed and developed by Framatome (former Areva) of France, each of 1650 MW, thus totalling 9900 MW. These are the third generation pressurised water reactors (PWR).

A memorandum of understanding was signed between the Indian and French governments and an agreement between Areva and the Nuclear Power Corporation of India during French president Nicolas Sarkozy's visit to India during December 2010. A new agreement between Électricité de France and the Nuclear Power Corporation of India was signed in March 2018.

Nuclear power plants generally feature significantly higher investment cost while day-to-day operating cost is lower compared to combustion plants.

A consortium of French financial institutions will finance this project as a loan. Both French and Indian government will give sovereign guarantee for this loan. The extent of guarantee will depend on what portion of the cost the French credit will cover. The Organisation for Economic Co-operation and Development (OECD) will govern the interest rates and other terms of agreement. Interest rates and other terms are under discussion.

It is one of several nuclear power projects being undertaken in a thin strip of coast of Raigad, Ratnagiri and Sindhudurg districts. The prospect of nuclear power generation in India received a boost after the Indo US Civilian Nuclear Agreement became operational in October 2008. India has also signed similar agreements with France and Russia.

In April 2021, EDF submitted a binding technico-commercial offer to NPCIL, setting out the conditions under which the project could be taken forward as part of "a long-term partnership between the French and Indian nuclear industries", and enabling discussions aimed at reaching a binding framework agreement "in the coming months". EDF would provide the technology but would not be an investor; NPCIL would be in charge of construction.

Controversy

Nuclear liability 
According to the Areva lack of clarity on The Civil Liability for Nuclear Damage Bill 2010 passed in Indian Parliament in August 2010 is a hurdle in finalising deal. This Civil Liability for Nuclear Damage Bill 2010 has a clause that deals with the legal binding of the culpable groups in case of a nuclear accident. It allows only the operator (NPCIL) to sue the manufacturers and suppliers. Victims will not be able to sue anyone. In reality, no one will be considered legally liable because the recourse taken by the operator will yield only . United States of America has a law on liability-related issues for all non-military nuclear facilities constructed in the United States before 2026 named Price–Anderson Nuclear Industries Indemnity Act. This American Act establishes a no fault insurance-type system in which the first $10 billion is industry-funded as described in the Act (any claims above the $10 billion would be covered by the federal government).

Debate 
Debate on nuclear power project at Jaitapur is ongoing on various levels. Environmental effects of nuclear power and geological issues have been raised by anti nuclear activists of India against this power project. Even though The Government of Maharashtra state completed land acquisition in January 2010, only 33 out of the 2,335 villagers had accepted compensation cheques as of November 2010.
As of 12 February 2014, land compensation has been accepted by all 2336 title holders. A public hearing on the environmental impact assessment (EIA) Report, prepared by NEERI was conducted by Maharashtra Pollution Control Board, on behalf of Ministry of Environment and Forests on 16 April 2010, at the plant site. The public hearing became controversial as the EIA report was not delivered for study to 3 of the 4 Gram panchayat (local village bodies) a month in advance.

A Public Interest Litigation (PIL) has also been filed against the government's civil nuclear program at the apex Supreme Court. The PIL specifically asks for the "staying of all proposed nuclear power plants till satisfactory safety measures and cost-benefit analyses are completed by independent agencies".

Opponents 
Since Jaitapur is a seismically sensitive area, the danger of an earthquake has been foremost on the minds of people. According to the Earthquake hazard zoning of India, Jaitapur comes under Zone III. This zone is called the moderate Risk Zone and covers areas liable to MSK VIII. The presence of two major creeks on the proposed site has been ignored while clearing the site.

It is not clear where the nuclear waste from the site will be shipped for recycling or removed for disposal. The plant is estimated to generate 300 tonnes of used nuclear fuel each year, the volume of a 2.5 m sided cube. Owing to the Generation III reactors having a higher fuel efficiency than previous Gen II designs, the smaller amount of used nuclear fuel from an EPR will contain "four times" as much fission products by volume, Iodine, Caesium, etc., compared to presently operating Gen II pressurised water reactors.

Since the plant will use the sea water for cooling and then release warmed water in the Arabian Sea, fishermen in villages around fear the destruction of fisheries in the nearby sea. Media articles also highlight the possible human and fisheries cost of this project.

An independent social impact assessment review of the project are being conducted by the Jamsetji Tata Centre for Disaster Management of the Tata Institute of Social Sciences (TISS). According to this report, the Government of India is has not been fully transparent with its citizens, and is hiding the huge negative impacts on the social and environmental development of the Konkan region in general. The government is allegedly manipulating the area seismic risk level, lowering it from high severity earthquake zone to moderate seismic severity zone. The report has been contested by NPCIL stating that they have done sufficient sensitization of the public and the exclusion of reprocessing plant from the 'environmental impact assessment report' was because there were no plan to establish one in Jaitapur.

Proponents
Proponents are advocating the Jaitapur Project as safe, environmentally benign and an economically viable source of electrical energy to meet the increasing electricity needs of India. 
They argue that nuclear power is a sustainable energy source that reduces carbon emissions and increases energy security by decreasing India's dependence on foreign oil. The promoter of Jaitapur project is Nuclear Power Corporation of India. It is a public Sector Enterprise under the administrative control of the Department of Atomic Energy (India).

As of 2010, India is sixth in rank, after USA, France, Japan, the Russian Federation and the Republic of Korea, to have twenty or more nuclear power reactors in operation.
According to former chairman of Atomic Energy Commission Anil Kakodkar, the Jaitapur site is the best as it fulfilled the technical and scientific requirements for a nuclear power plant. 
It is proposed that the spent fuel generated at this nuclear power plant be recycled. Only five percent of it would be encapsulated and stored for 30 to 40 years, till scientists develop some technology to treat it.
The environmental impact assessment and other associated studies of the Jaitapur project have been carried out in detail over the last few years by National Environmental Engineering Research Institute (NEERI), Nagpur in collaboration with several other reputed organisations specialising in specific environment studies.

These studies include Bhabha Atomic Research Centre Pre-operational Baseline Radiological Survey of the Area around JNPP Site, Central Water and Power Research Station Pune, Thermal Dispersion Studies for Condenser Cooling Water (CCW) Discharges, Konkan Krishi Vidyapith, College of Forestry, Dapoli, Baseline Biodiversity Study of the area around JNPP Site.

Nuclear Power Corporation of India has declared that 1.5 to 2 percent of the net profit from Jaitapur plant would be spent in that area only. Development projects will be decided by local people and NPC will provide the funds to ensure development of these areas.

Protests 
Many protests have been carried out by the local population against the proposed nuclear power plant. On 29 December 2009, 12 January 2010, and 22 January 2010, when the government authorities visited Madban for distribution of cheques in lieu of compulsory land acquisition, the villagers refused to accept the cheques. Government officials were shown black flags, and were denied any co-operation in carrying out their activities. 72 people were arrested on 22 January 2010 when people protested against the compulsory land acquisition.

Debate about the nuclear power project at Jaitapur is ongoing on various levels. Environmental effects of nuclear power and geological issues have been raised by anti nuclear activists. On 4 December 2010, protests became violent when over 1500 people were detained from among thousands of protesters, who included environmentalists and local villagers.

Members and leaders of the Konkan Bachao Samiti (KBS) and the Janahit Seva Samiti (organisations that are spearheading opposition to the project) were also detained. In Mumbai, members of various trade unions and social organisations came together to protest against the project. The protesters raised doubts about the neutrality of the Environment Impact Assessment Report prepared by the National Environmental Engineering Research Institute (NEERI), which forms the basis of environmental clearance for the project. Parallel studies carried out by the Bombay Natural History Society show that the Jaitapur nuclear plant project will cause substantial environmental damage.

On 18 April 2011, one man was shot and killed by police and eight were injured after protests turned violent.

See also

 Economics of new nuclear power plants
 Energy policy of India
 Generation IV reactor
 Nuclear power in India
 Nuclear renaissance

References

Further reading

 Struwe, D. Jacobs, H. Imke, U. Consequence evaluation of in-vessel fuel coolant interactions in the European Pressurized Water Reactor ISSN 0947-8620
 
 Lovins, Amory B. and Price, John H. (1975). Non-Nuclear Futures: The Case for an Ethical Energy Strategy (Cambridge, Mass.: Ballinger Publishing Company, 1975. xxxii + 223pp.).
 with Mycle Schneider, Antony Froggatt, and Doug Koplow. The World Nuclear Industry Status Report 2009 Commissioned by German Federal Ministry of Environment, Nature Conservation and Reactor Safety, August 2009.
 Voices from Chernobyl: The Oral History of a Nuclear Disaster (Dalkey Archive Press 2005)
 Cravens, Gwyneth (2007). Power to Save the World: the Truth about Nuclear Energy. New York: Knopf. pp. 464. .
 Herbst, Alan M. and George W. Hopley (2007). Nuclear Energy Now: Why the Time has come for the World's Most Misunderstood Energy Source, Wiley.
 Elliott, David (2007). Nuclear or Not? Does Nuclear Power Have a Place in a Sustainable Energy Future?, Palgrave.

External links
 Nuclear Power Corporation of India (official site)
 Data sheet and people protests Jaitapur Nuclear Power Project
 Resisting Jaitapur Nuclear Power Project 
 Resources on Jaitapur nuclear power project

Nuclear power stations in Maharashtra
Energy in Maharashtra
Proposed nuclear power stations
Proposed power stations in India
Ratnagiri district